Everard Perrin (8 September 1890 – 25 December 1945) was a New Zealand cricketer. He played in four first-class matches for Canterbury from 1917 to 1919.

See also
 List of Canterbury representative cricketers

References

External links
 

1890 births
1945 deaths
New Zealand cricketers
Canterbury cricketers
People from Bulls, New Zealand